Arnaud Kerckhof (born March 13, 1984) is a French professional basketball player for BC Orchies of LNB Pro B.

On June 18, 2013, after three seasons at Boulazac Basket Dordogne, he decided to prolong his stay with the team despite its relegation to Pro B. He played an important role in the recovery of his club in Pro A during the playoffs in 2017.

He re-signed with Boulazac Basket Dordogne on July 13, 2017.

On August 10, 2018, after eight years at Boulazac, he signed with BC Orchies.

References

External links
RealGM profile

1984 births
Living people
BCM Gravelines players
BC Orchies players
French men's basketball players
Nanterre 92 players
Olympique Antibes basketball players
Sportspeople from Calais
Point guards